SECU Arena is a 5,200-seat multi-purpose arena on the Towson University campus in Towson, Maryland.  The arena was completed and opened in 2013, and now hosts the men's and women's basketball teams, as well as the volleyball and gymnastics teams. It replaced the Towson Center, which had been in use since 1976.
The arena has 340 club seats, four private suites and 104 court side seats. Upon opening, the arena was awarded LEED Gold certification for energy use, lighting, water and material use, and other sustainable features.

In addition to being the home of several Towson sports teams, the arena also serves several other functions. It has been used as a concert arena for artists such as the Backstreet Boys, Playboi Carti, Gavin DeGraw, and Juicy J. Since opening, the arena has been host to an annual performance by the Harlem Globetrotters. Additionally, both the university and local Baltimore County high schools use the facility for their commencement ceremonies.

In 2017 the Baltimore Blast moved to SECU after 37 years at Royal Farms Arena.

See also
 List of NCAA Division I basketball arenas
 State Employees Credit Union of Maryland (SECU Maryland)

References

External links
SECU Arena Homepage
SECU Website

College basketball venues in the United States
Basketball venues in Maryland
Towson Tigers sports venues
Towson Tigers men's basketball
Indoor arenas in Maryland
Sports venues in the Baltimore metropolitan area
Buildings and structures in Baltimore County, Maryland
2013 establishments in Maryland
Sports venues completed in 2013
College volleyball venues in the United States
Indoor soccer venues in the United States